Ontario came into being as a province of Canada in 1867 but historians use the term to cover its entire history. This article also covers the  history of the territory Ontario now occupies.

For a complete list of the premiers of Ontario, see List of Ontario premiers.

Prehistory 
10,000 BCE Early Palaeolithic peoples lived in the spruce woodlands of Southwestern Ontario with mastodons and mammoths. People living in this time period, referred to by archeologists as Early Palaeoindian, created and used stone tools.
8,500 BCE Late Palaeolithic peoples inhabited the now boreal pine forests of Southwestern Ontario hunting caribou, Arctic fox and rabbit or hare with darts and spear throwers made from materials obtained through trade or travel with others at great distances. People living in this time period are referred to by archeologists as Late Palaeoindian
8,000 - 800 BCE During the Archaic Period, the climate warmed further. People living in the deciduous forests of Southwestern Ontario, hunted a wide variety of woodland animals. Deer and fish were important to their survival. The caribou had moved north. Larger trade networks were established, extending as far as the Gulf of Mexico, and the Atlantic seaboard. Tools now included: nets, weirs, bows, arrows, and implements made of copper. People also fashioned copper into beads and bracelets.
900 BCE to 1610 AD During the Woodland Era, pottery was first created. In the middle years, two distinct cultural groups emerged: Princess Point, and Riviere au Vase.
600-800 AD Ontario Haudenosaunee (Iroquoian) Tradition Princess Point culture began focusing on horticulture—specifically the "Three Sisters" (corn, beans, and squash)—forming a complex matrilineal society. During this same period, the Western Riviere au Vase culture established a patrilineal Anishnaabe (Algonquin)  society, continuing to follow a traditional seasonal migratory lifestyle.

1762 and earlier 
Aboriginal people lived on the land for millennia before European settlers came for means of exploration and colonization.
Before Europeans traveled to North America, first nations people, mostly Algonquian and Iroquoian,  shared the land where Ontario is now located.
 1610 – Samuel de Champlain begins dispatching  to live among the Huron and the western Algonquin. The  played a multi-faceted role as interpreters, trade promoters, and explorers, who sought to align indigenous groups with the French.
1611 – Henry Hudson visits Hudson Bay and claims the region for Great Britain.
1615 – Samuel de Champlain visits Lake Huron, after which French missionaries establish outposts in the region.
1616 – Date of an early map of New France, entitled La Nouvelle France, which included much of what would become Southern Ontario. The map is attributed to Samuel de Champlain.
1639
Summer – Construction begins on Sainte-Marie among the Hurons, intended as a central headquarters for the French mission in Huronia.
November 1 – The first French mission to the Petun is established.
1640
Native population is estimated by the French to be 80,000 in what is now a large part of southern Ontario (areas to south and west of Lake Simcoe).
The Iroquois raid the southernmost Petun settlement of Ehwae.
The Jesuits conduct a "winter mission" to the Neutrals during the winter of 1640–41.
1642 – In June, the Huron Rock Clan frontier settlement of Contarea is destroyed in a "massive attack" by Iroquois forces.
1646 – In October, the French reactivate their mission to the Petun, with missionaries taking up residence in Ekarenniondi and Etharita.
1647 – The Iroquois raid the Petun settlement of Etharita.
1648 – Iroquois revolt against trespassing French, destroying a Jesuit mission near the site of present-day Midland (see Canadian Martyrs).
circa 1649–54 – Iroquois drive the Hurons, Petun and Neutral Nation from their territories. Around the same time, another population movement of the Mississaugas from the north shores of Lake Huron and Manitoulin Island to the Kawartha Lakes and Credit River areas.
1649
 March 16 – The Iroquois capture the Huron settlements of St. Ignace and St. Louis.
 March 19 – Inhabitants of the Huron town of Ossossané, along with its surrounding villages, flee the Iroquois advance overnight across an ice-covered Georgian Bay to take refuge among the Petun.
 May 1 – Many Huron refugees living amongst the Petun depart with the Jesuit priest Pierre-Joseph-Marie Chaumonot to Christian Island.
 December 7 – An Iroquois war party destroys the Petun settlement of Etharita (also known as St. Jean). This had become the southernmost Petun settlement after the abandonment of those to the south of it.
1668 – Father Marquette founds Sault Ste. Marie, noteworthy as the oldest surviving permanent European settlement in both Ontario and neighbouring Michigan.
1670 – The Hudson's Bay Company is granted a British royal charter to conduct the Indian Trade in the 3.9 million square kilometer territory named after Prince Rupert of the Rhine known as Rupert Land.  This area includes much of what is now Northern Ontario and represents about 1/3 of the land size of Canada.
1673–establishment of Cataraqui (modern day Kingston, Ontario).

Part of Province of Quebec, 1763 to 1790 
1763 – Britain wins the Seven Years' War and takes full control of the future Ontario
1768 – Guy Carleton commissioned "Captain General and Governor in Chief" on 12 April 1768. He remains in command at Quebec till  1778.
1775–1783 American War for Independence
 1778 – Sir Frederick Haldimand takes command as “Captain General and Governor in Chief" 26 June 1778. He occupied Cataraqui (Kingston, Ont.), reinforced Niagara and Detroit, and strengthened other military outposts against the American threat
1779—Haldimand sends Captain Dietrich Brehm to strengthen the line of communication between Montreal and Detroit; over 5,000 Indians forced out of New York come to Ft. Niagara for food and shelter; he increases the goods distributed as gifts through the Indian Department from about £10,000 in 1778 to £63,861 in 1782.
1783 – The Treaty of Paris ends the war; U.S. boundary along the St.Lawrence and Great Lakes
 1784 – Haldimand purchases lands for exiled Loyalists from the Mississaugas for or £1,180
 1784 Haldimand sets up 8 new townships for settlement along the upper St Lawrence from the westernmost seigneury to modern Brockville, Ontario, and five more around Cataraqui.
1784 – About 9,000 United Empire Loyalists are settled in what is now southern Ontario, chiefly in Niagara, around the Bay of Quinte, and along the St. Lawrence River between Lake Ontario and Montreal. They are soon followed by many more Americans, some of them not so much ardent loyalists but attracted nonetheless by the availability of cheap, arable land.

At the same time large numbers of Iroquois loyal to Britain arrive from the United States and are settled on reserves west of Lake Ontario.

Kingston and Hamilton became important settlements as a result of the influx of Loyalists.
1786 – Haldimand replaced by Carleton, now Lord Dorchester.
1788 – On July 24, 1788, Governor General Lord Dorchester proclaims the land area to be divided up into "Lower Canada" with a French legal system and "Upper Canada" with a British legal System, whereby the land districts had been named Lunenburg, Mecklenburg, Nassau and Hesse in honour of the Royal family and the present large Germanic population.
1788 – The British purchase 250,000 acres (1,000 km2) on which they begin the settlement of York, now Toronto
 Thousands of Pennsylvania Dutch (German) farmers move from Pennsylvania to Upper Canada between the 1780s and the 1830s; they claimed a share of the United Empire Loyalists' foundational myth, drawing on its themes of loyalty and sacrifice.

Upper Canada, 1791 to 1840 

1791 – The Constitutional Act of 1791 followed the Dorchester Proclamation of 1788 and thereby creates the first land registry for Quebec Upper Canada and the part of present-day Ontario south of Lake Nipissing plus the current Ontario shoreline of Georgian Bay and Lake Superior, and Lower Canada (the southern part of present-day Quebec). Upper Canada's first capital is Newark (present-day Niagara-on-the-Lake); in 1797 it is moved to York, now Toronto.

The population of Upper Canada grows from 6,000 in 1785 to 14,000 in 1790 to 46,000 in 1806. (Lower Canada's is about 165,000). The population is rural, and based on subsistence agriculture, with few exports; government spending is a major source of revenue.
1790s–1840s – Dueling is common among the elite, government officials, lawyers, and to military officers; they used dueling as a form of extralegal justice to assert their superior claims to honour. However, a new ethic was emerging that opposed dueling and rejected the hyper-masculinity embodied by the code of the duelist. This opposition was part of growing opposition to hierarchic dominance by the elite; opponents valued the bourgeois husband and father and separated male honour from physical violence.
1793 – John Graves Simcoe is appointed as the first governor of Upper Canada. He encourages immigration from the United States, builds roads. Slavery was gradually abolished starting in 1793 by the Act Against Slavery.
1795 – The Jay Treaty is ratified by which Britain agreed to vacate its Great Lakes forts on U.S. territory.  Britain continues to supply the First Nations operating in the United States with arms and ammunition.
1800 – First European settlement on the site of present-day Ottawa
 1801 – First ironworks in Upper Canada, located at Furnace Falls near Lyndhurst
1803 – The North West Company moves its mid-continent headquarters from Grand Portage, Minnesota to Fort William, now part of Thunder Bay to be in Upper Canada.
1803 – Thomas Talbot retires to his land grant in Western Ontario centred around present day St. Thomas and begins settling it. He eventually becomes responsible for settling 65,000 acres (260 km2). His insistence on the provision and maintenance of good roads, and on reserving land along main roads to productive uses rather than to clergy reserves leads to this region becoming the most prosperous in the province.
1804 – First European settlement on the site of present-day Waterloo
1807 – First settlement, Ebytown, on the site of present-day Kitchener
1809 – The first documented appearance of steam navigation on the Great Lakes is at Prescott, when the steamship Dalhousie was launched for service on the Saint Lawrence River.
1812–1814 – The War of 1812 with the United States. Upper Canada is the chief target of the Americans, since it is weakly defended and populated largely by American immigrants. However, division in the United States over the war, the incompetence of American military commanders, and swift and decisive action by the British commander, Sir Isaac Brock, keep Upper Canada part of British North America.
1812–1813 – Detroit is captured by the British on August 6, 1812. The Michigan Territory is held under British control until it was abandoned in 1813.
1813 – The Americans send an army of 10,000 men under General William Henry Harrison to recapture Detroit.  British and Tecumseh's forces win the first battle at Frenchtown, January 22, 1813, killing 400 Americans and taking 500 prisoners, many of whom are then killed.
 1813 May – British and Indian forces fail in their siege of Fort Meigs, at the mouth of Maumee river; in August, they are repulsed at Fort Stephenson
1813 September 10 – At the Battle of Lake Erie, the American Navy, decisively destroys British naval power on Lake Erie.  British and Tecumseh forces, with their logistics destroyed, retreat back toward Niagara
1813 October 5 – At the Battle of the Thames  (also called "Battle of Moraviantown"), General Harrison, with 4500 infantry intercepts the retreating British and Indian forces and win a decisive victory. British power in western Ontario is ended, Tecumseh is killed, and his Indian coalition collapses.  Americans take control of western Ontario for the remainder of the war, and permanently end the threat of Indian raids into Ohio, Indiana, and Michigan.
1814 – Population 95,000.
1815 – War ends and prewar boundaries are reestablished. One of the legacies of the war in Upper Canada is strong feelings of anti-Americanism which persist to this day and form an important component of Canadian nationalism.
1816 – Waterloo adopts its current name to honour the battle of Waterloo.
1817 – By the Rush–Bagot Treaty, Britain and the United States agree to keep large war vessels out of the Great Lakes.
1818 – The Treaty of 1818 reduces boundary and fishing disputes between British North America and the United States.
1820s–1840 – The Family Compact is a closed oligarchy of landowners, royal officials, lawyers, and businessmen who virtually monopolized public office and controlled the economy of the province in the 1820s and 1830s.
1820 – The Talbot Settlement is now completely settled, having resumed following interruption during the war years.
1821 – The North West Company merges with the Hudson's Bay Company
1823 – Peter Robinson settles the Bathurst District near Ottawa with immigrants from Cork County, Ireland.
1824 – The Church of Scotland is granted a share of the revenues from clergy reserves.  Presbyterians by the 1830s were a major force for social conservatism. Ministers sent from Scotland in the 1820s and 1830s were surprised by the ethnic diversity, and horrified at the frontier way of life, which they saw as a devil's compound of illiteracy, drunkenness, ignorance of religion, and lack of schools. They promoted conservatism as a means of implanting  Scottish moral values.
1825 – Peter Robinson settles Scott's Plains (later renamed Peterborough in his honour).
1826 – first settlement of London
1826 – With the creation of the Canada Company, free land is no longer available to immigrants willing to set up homesteads and farms.
1829 – as a result of the Fugitive slave laws in the United States, the first colony of Black pioneers arrives from Ohio to uncleared land north of London, Ontario. The routes they travelled to Upper Canada become known as the Underground Railroad.
1831 – Population 236,000.
1832 – completion of the Rideau Canal from Kingston to Ottawa after six years of construction.
1832 – a serious cholera outbreak spreads quickly from Lower Canada killing thousands.
1833 – Building of the first Welland Canal by William Hamilton Merritt
1837 – Rebellions of 1837 - Upper Canada Rebellion in favour of responsible government; a similar rebellion (the Lower Canada Rebellion) occurred in Quebec. In the world context of  Atlantic revolutions, the Canadian reformers took their inspiration from the republicanism of the American Revolution. They demanded right to participate in the political process through the election of representatives; they sought to make the legislative council elective rather than appointed. The British military crushed both  rebellions, ending any possibility the two Canadas would become republics.
1839 – Lord Durham publishes his report on the causes of the rebellions in 1837.
1840 – The assembly passes a law providing for the sale of the clergy reserves, but it is disallowed by the British government.
1840 – Upper Canada is now heavily in debt as a result of its heavy investments in canals.

The United Province of Canada (Canada West), 1841 to 1867 
1841 – Upper and Lower Canada are united by the Act of Union 1840 to form the Province of Canada, as recommended by Durham. Upper Canada becomes known as Canada West and Lower Canada as Canada East.
1841 – Population 455,000.
1841 – Sydenham dies in a riding accident and is replaced by Sir Charles Bagot. The movement for responsible government which had been growing under Sydenham is now so strong that Bagot realizes that to govern effectively he must admit French leaders to his executive council. Once admitted, Canada East Reformer Louis-Hippolyte Lafontaine insists that Canada West Reformer Robert Baldwin also be admitted. Bagot admits Baldwin as well, creating a Reform bloc.
1843 – Bagot retires because of illness and is replaced by Sir Charles Metcalfe, who is determined to make no further concessions to the colonists. Metcalfe refuses a demand by Baldwin and Francis Hincks that the assembly approve official appointments. The ministry in the assembly resigns, and in the ensuing election a slim majority supporting Metcalfe is returned.
1846 – The Colonial Secretary, Lord Grey, rules that the British North American lieutenant governors must rule with the consent of the governed. Executive councils are to be selected from the majority in the assembly, and change when the confidence of the assembly changes. Britain is abandoning the mercantilist principles which have guided its imperial policy, and since colonial trade will no longer be restricted, local colonial politics need no longer be restricted.
1846 – Britain begins the repeal of preferential tariffs to the colonies, starting with the Corn Laws. These actions essentially spur on the beginning of later negotiated trade agreements with the United States.
1847 – Canada is overwhelmed with 104,000 immigrants, many suffering from typhus who arrive that year alone escaping the Great Famine of Ireland. 1700 typhus deaths, including doctors, nurses, priests and others who aide the sick. They land at Grosse Île, Canada East and Partridge Island, New Brunswick. Large numbers go on to settle in Canada West. Bytown (Ottawa), Kingston and Toronto receive more than other places, putting a strain on local resources while at the same drastically increasing and changing the composition of the population in the province.
1848 – Lord Elgin, who had replaced Metcalfe in 1847, asks Baldwin and Lafontaine to form a government following their success in elections for the assembly. This is the Province of Canada's first responsible government.
1849 – Elgin signs the Rebellion Losses Bill, which provided compensation for losses suffered during the Lower Canada Rebellion, over the opposition of English conservatives (Tories) in Canada East, who were accustomed to having the governor support them. In reaction, a Tory mob burns down the parliament building in Montreal but Elgin, supported by majorities in both Canada East and Canada West (which had already passed a similar bill), does not back down, and responsible government is established in fact.
1849 – The Canada East Tories then sponsor an Annexation Manifesto calling for the province of Canada to join the United States. They were motivated by the loss of trade threatened by the repeal of the British Corn Laws. However, the rest of the Canadian population opposes the manifesto, including the Tories of Canada West, who favour provincial union. Union with the United States ceases to be an important political issue.
1850 – The Robinson Treaties are negotiated by William Benjamin Robinson with the Ojibwe nation transferring to the Crown the eastern and northern shores of Lake Huron and the northern shore of Lake Superior.
1851 – The population of Canada West is now 952,000 having more than doubled in 10 years, by then numerically superior to that of Canada East. Politicians of Canada West begin to argue for representation by population ('rep by pop').
1854 – An agreement for reciprocal lowering of trade barriers is reached between British North America and the United States. The British North American provinces can now send their natural products (principally grain, timber, and fish) to the United States without tariff, while American fishermen are allowed into British North American fisheries. Lake Michigan and the St. Lawrence River are opened to ships of all signatories.
1854 – A law secularizing the clergy reserves is passed; the Anglican and Presbyterian churches retain their endowments.
1855 – The American canal at Sault Ste. Marie on the St. Marys River (Michigan–Ontario) opened in May which opened Lake Superior to American and Canadian navigation, and made access to the Red River colony in Manitoba easier.
1855 – The Great Western Railway links Windsor with Hamilton and Toronto.
1856 – The Grand Trunk Railway opens between Sarnia and Montreal greatly enhancing the flow of goods and people across Southern Ontario and trade links with the American Midwest. Towns along its route swell in importance and population.
1858 – Canada has become increasingly sectional, with Canada West electing Clear Grit Liberals and Canada East electing Conservatives. A coalition government led by John A. Macdonald and Antoine-Aimé Dorion falls in two days. In the assembly Alexander Galt proposes a federal union of the British North American colonies as a solution to the problem.
1858 – The temporary judicial districts of Algoma and Nipissing are created, the first in Northern Ontario.
1859 – The Clear Grit Liberals under George Brown propose specific arrangements for a federal union of the two Canadas.
1861 – Population is 1,396,000.
1864 – A committee proposed by George Brown to inquire into solutions to the parliamentary deadlock between the Canadas recommends a federal union of the British North American colonies, a solution which is welcomed by all sides. A government of Liberals and Conservatives, the Great Coalition, is formed to pursue this goal. Representatives of the coalition attend the Charlottetown Conference called to discuss union of the maritime colonies and persuade the representatives to endorse the Canadian plan for a broader federal union. A conference in Quebec City draws up the Quebec Resolutions, a plan for this union.
1866 – The Westminster Conference endorses the Quebec Resolutions with minor changes.
1866 – After a minor skirmish on the Niagara Peninsulia at Ridgeway, the Fenians withdraw back the United States. This incident only hastens the publics desire for full-fledged nationhood (see Fenian raids).

1867 to 1985 
Canada 1867 and after. The Province of Ontario 1867 and after
1867 – The parliament of the United Kingdom passes the British North America Act, by which the provinces of United Canada, New Brunswick, and Nova Scotia join to form Canada. United Canada was split into Canada East/Est and Canada West/Ouest, the latter of which eventually changed its name to Ontario.  The capital of Canada West was the city of York, which later changed its name to Toronto.
1870 – There is large public support amongst Protestants for the trying of Louis Riel for treason for executing Thomas Scott during the so-called Red River Rebellion in Manitoba, while many Quebecers support Riel. Although Riel's government was finally recognized by Canada, its actions are destined to be described as a rebellion ever after. Tensions rise between Quebec and English Canada.
1870 – the head of construction for the Dawson Road to Manitoba is named Prince Arthur's Landing by Colonel Garnet Wolseley during the Red River Rebellion.
1870s – The growth of industry in Ontario and Quebec leads to a movement for protective tariffs.
1871 – The first census following Confederation puts Ontario's population at 1,620,851.
1871 – Thunder Bay District, Ontario, is created out of the western portion of Algoma District, Ontario.
1872 – contracts are let by the federal government to survey the route through Northwestern Ontario of the Canadian Pacific Railway, to stimulate settlement of Western Canada, to bring Western agricultural and other products to Ontario and Quebec, and to link British Columbia to the rest of the country. The railway is part of Sir John A. Macdonald's National Policy.
1872–1896 – The provincial government of Oliver Mowat vigorously defends provincial rights and expands the scope of provincial power.
1874 – First issue of The Nation, founded by members of the Canada First movement to help in creating a Canadian nationality. Although the journal only lasted until 1876, other publications continued the effort after it stopped publishing.
1875 – Construction of the Canadian Pacific Railway begins in June at Fort William, Ontario.
1879 – The federal government of Sir John A. Macdonald, as part of its national Policy, institutes protective tariffs on manufactures and on farm products; the tariffs help Ontario industry but hurt farmers.
1882 – The Canadian Pacific Railway Thunder Bay to Winnipeg is completed in June by the federal government.
1883 – Important mineral deposits are found near Sudbury; this and similar discoveries, especially near Cobalt, triggered a mining boom in Northern Ontario. The region acquires a large French-speaking population as Quebeckers move there to work in the boom.
1885 – The split between the Orange in Ontario and Roman Catholic Quebec is aggravated further by Protestant public support in Ontario for the hanging of Louis Riel, convicted of treason for his role in the North-West Rebellion that year.
1885–Rainy River District, Ontario is created after Toronto its boundaries case before the Judicial Committee of the Privy Council.
1889 – The Imperial Parliament confirms Ontario's right to Northwestern Ontario west to Lake of the Woods and north of the Albany River by incorporation of sections of the District of Keewatin.
1890–1896 – Tension between English and French is further aggravated by the disagreement between Ontario and Quebec over the Manitoba Schools Question. Ontario objects to a federal remedial bill to restore French schools in Manitoba in part because of its support for provincial rights, and in part because of the influence of a Protestant Equal rights movement begun in response to pro-Roman Catholic policies instituted in Quebec.
1893 – A severe economic recession hits dropping the province's industrial output. Many in Ontario seek new opportunities further west following the recently completed transcontinental railroad.
1896 – The Judicial Committee of the Privy Council rules that the federal government may exercise its reserve power only in time of war. This results in an increase in provincial power as areas of provincial responsibility are interpreted more broadly to accommodate new types of government initiative (social welfare, for example).
1896 – Sir Oliver Mowat resigns after 24 years as premier.
1906 – Establishment of the Hydro-Electric Power Commission of Ontario by the government of Sir James P. Whitney at the urging of Sir Adam Beck.
1912 – Ontario acquires its current territory by incorporation of further sections of the North-West territories
1912 – Regulation 17 bans teaching in French after the first year of school and the teaching of French after the fourth; this infuriates Francophones across Canada and further divides the country.
1914–1918 – First World War
1916 – The city of Berlin, under pressure to demonstrate the loyalty of its many citizens of German origin to the war effort changes its name to Kitchener
1916–1927 – Ontario prohibits the domestic consumption of beer and spirits. Beer and spirits continue to be produced for export. Prohibition ends in 1927, however the ban of public bars selling alcohol is still in place until 1934.
1937 – Premier Mitchell Hepburn uses the Ontario Provincial Police to suppress an CIO strike at General Motors in Oshawa after the federal government refuses to suppress it. Hepburn is unsuccessful in keeping the CIO out of Ontario.
1943 – George Drew and the Progressive Conservative Party of Ontario are elected, beginning 42 years of Conservative government.
1951 – In response to a civil rights movement which originated in opposition to racial discrimination in Dresden, Ontario, the government of Leslie Frost passes Canada's first Fair Employment Practices Act, which forbids discrimination on the basis of race, creed, colour, nationality, ancestry or place of origin. However, the act is enforced administratively, with prosecution only a last resort.
1951 – The Frost government passes Ontario's first equal pay legislation, the Female Employees Fair Remuneration Act.
1954 – The Frost government introduces Canada's first Fair Accommodation Practices Act. Like the Fair Employment Practices Act it is enforced administratively, with prosecution only a last resort.
1955 – The first conviction under the Fair Accommodation Practices Act, of Kay's Cafe in Dresden, the site of the original complaint of racial discrimination in Dresden, is overturned on appeal.
1956 – First successful prosecution under the Fair Accommodation Practices Act, again of Kay's Cafe in Dresden
1962 – Passage of the Ontario Human Rights Code, which amalgamates and extends previous laws about civil rights.
1966 – The government of John Robarts introduces universal health insurance within the province.
1967 – The Ontario Pavilion is opened at Expo 67 in Montreal, and Ontario gets its unofficial theme song: "A Place to Stand, A Place to Grow".
1967 – GO Transit commuter rail network begins operation in the Toronto region.
1970 – The provincially funded TVOntario goes on the air.
1971 – Ontario Place theme park opens in Toronto created by the Government of Ontario
1976 – The CN Tower in Toronto is completed and opens to the public.
1979 – A train derailment in Mississauga causes the largest evacuation of a city in North American history.

Since 1985
1985 – The Progressive Conservative government of Frank Miller falls, ending 42 years of the "Big Blue Machine". David Peterson's Liberals gain power to be lost in 1989 to the NDP.
1985 – Brewer's Retail strike cripples the hospitality industry throughout the summer
1988 – Toronto hosts the 14th G7 conference
1989 – Canada–U.S. Free Trade Agreement goes into effect
1990–1992 – A major recession hits Ontario. Many companies began to massively downsize and threaten to leave Canada all together. New advancements in manufacturing such as automation and globalization further destabilize the Province, and lead to a decade of instability
1993 – Due to major budget shortfalls, the government of Bob Rae introduces its so-called social contract (nicknamed Rae Days) which re-opens public-sector collective agreements with the intent of rolling back wages; his New Democratic Party's traditional labour support is greatly weakened.
1994 – The North American Free Trade Agreement comes into effect.
1994 – The Ontario budget deficit reaches $17 billion (CAD)
1995 – The Progressive Conservative Party wins a large majority running on the concept of the Common Sense Revolution
1995 – Native protester Dudley George killed by Ontario Provincial Police officers at Ipperwash.
1997 – The province passes the Bill 103 (the 'Mega City' bill) that calls for the dissolution of Metro Toronto and merging of 6 cities within it to create the new City of Toronto.
1998 – The government of Mike Harris begins privatizing the Hydro-Electric Power Commission of Ontario.
1999 – Highway 407 is sold to a private company (built in 1997)
2000 – Seven people die after contamination of Walkerton's water supply.
2001 – The former City of Ottawa merges with the Regional Municipality of Ottawa–Carleton to form the new city Ottawa.
2003 – Outbreak of SARS in Toronto; 44 die and tourist revenue drops by half. The World Health Organization advises against all but essential travel to the city.
2003 – Two decisions of the Court of Appeal for Ontario legalize same-sex marriage in Ontario.
2003 – Most of Ontario is plunged into darkness after a major electrical blackout hits  Eastern North America
2003 – The Liberal party returns to power under the leadership of Dalton McGuinty.
2007 – The Liberal party remains in power and keeps control of its majority government.
2010 – Dalton McGuinty's Liberals end Ontario's use of the GST and creates the HST
2010 – Muskoka host the G8 summit, and Toronto Hosts the G20 summit.
2010 – The Ontario debt surpasses $200 billion (CAD)
2011 – The Ontario Liberals lose their majority, yet remain in power with a minority government in the Ontario general election.
2012 – Premier Dalton McGuinty resigns amidst numerous scandals.
2020 – Premier Doug Ford declared a state of emergency in the province, amid the COVID-19 pandemic in Ontario.
2021 – Premier Doug Ford declared a second state of emergency in the province, amid the COVID-19 pandemic in Ontario.

Bibliography

General
 The Dictionary of Canadian Biography(1966–2006), thousands of scholarly biographies of those who died before 1931
  Gough, Barry M. Historical Dictionary of Canada (1999) excerpt and text search
 Hallowell, Gerald, ed. The Oxford Companion to Canadian History (2004) 1650 short entries excerpt and text search
 Marsh, James C. ed. The Canadian Encyclopedia 4 vol 1985; also cd-ROM and online editions
Pound, Richard W. Fitzhenry & Whiteside Book of Canadian Facts and Dates, Fitzhenry & Whiteside, 2004. 
 Toye, William, ed.  The Oxford Companion to Canadian Literature. Oxford U. Press, 1983. 843 pp.

Surveys
 Celebrating One Thousand Years of Ontario's History: Proceedings of the Celebrating One Thousand Years of Ontario's History Symposium, April 14, 15, and 16, 2000. Ontario Historical Society, 2000. 343 pp.
  Baskerville, Peter A.  Sites of Power: A Concise History of Ontario. Oxford U. Press., 2005. 296 pp.  (first edition was Ontario: Image, Identity and Power, 2002). online review
 Chambers, Lori, and Edgar-Andre Montigny, eds. Ontario Since Confederation: A Reader (2000), articles by scholars
 Hall, Roger; Westfall, William; and MacDowell, Laurel Sefton, eds.  Patterns of the Past: Interpreting Ontario's History. Dundurn Pr., 1988. 406 pp.
 McGowan, Mark George and Clarke, Brian P., eds.  Catholics at the "Gathering Place": Historical Essays on the Archdiocese of Toronto, 1841–1991. Canadian Catholic Historical Assoc.; Dundurn, 1993. 352 pp.
 McKillop, A. B.  Matters of Mind: The University in Ontario, 1791–1951. U. of Toronto Press, 1994. 716 pp.
 Mays, John Bentley.  Arrivals: Stories from the History of Ontario. Penguin Books Canada, 2002. 418 pp.
 Noel, S. J. R.  Patrons, Clients, Brokers: Ontario Society and Politics, 1791–1896. U. of Toronto Press, 1990.

Ontario to 1869
  Careless, J. M. S. Brown of the Globe (2 vols, Toronto, 1959–63), vol 1: The Voice of Upper Canada 1818-1859; vol 2: The Statesman of Confederation 1860–1880.
 Clarke, John. Land Power and Economics on the Frontier of Upper Canada (2001) 747pp.
 Clarke, John. The Ordinary People of Essex: Environment, Culture, and Economy on the Frontier of Upper Canada (2010)
 Cohen, Marjorie Griffin.  Women's Work, Markets, and Economic Development in Nineteenth-Century Ontario. (1988). 258 pp.
Craig, Gerald M Upper Canada: the formative years 1784–1841 McClelland and Stewart, 1963, the standard history online edition
 Dunham, Eileen Political unrest in Upper Canada 1815–1836 (1963).
 Errington, Jane The Lion, the Eagle, and Upper Canada: A Developing Colonial Ideology (1987).
 Gidney, R. D. and Millar, W. P. J.  Professional Gentlemen: The Professions in Nineteenth-Century Ontario. (1994).
 Grabb, Edward, James Curtis, Douglas Baer; "Defining Moments and Recurring Myths: Comparing Canadians and Americans after the American Revolution" The Canadian Review of Sociology and Anthropology, Vol. 37, 2000
 Johnson, J. K. and Wilson, Bruce G., eds.  Historical Essays on Upper Canada: New Perspectives. (1975). . 604 pp.
 Keane, David and Read, Colin, ed.  Old Ontario: Essays in Honour of J. M. S. Careless. (1990).
 Kilbourn, William.; The Firebrand: William Lyon Mackenzie and the Rebellion in Upper Canada (1956) online edition
 Knowles, Norman.  Inventing the Loyalists: The Ontario Loyalist Tradition and the Creation of Usable Pasts. (1997). 244 pp.
 Landon, Fred, and J.E. Middleton. Province of Ontario: A History (1927) 4 vol. with 2 vol of biographies
 Lewis, Frank and Urquhart, M.C. Growth and standard of living in a pioneer economy: Upper Canada 1826–1851 Institute for Economic Research, Queen's University, 1997.
 McCalla, Douglas Planting the province: the economic history of Upper Canada 1784–1870 (1993).
 McGowan, Mark G.  Michael Power: The Struggle to Build the Catholic Church on the Canadian Frontier. (2005). 382 pp.  online review from H-CANADA
 McNairn, Jeffrey L The capacity to judge: public opinion and deliberative democracy in Upper Canada 1791–1854 (2000). online review from H-CANADA
 Oliver, Peter.  "Terror to Evil-Doers": Prisons and Punishments in Nineteenth-Century Ontario. (1998). 575 pp.  post 1835
 Rea, J. Edgar.  "Rebellion in Upper Canada, 1837" Manitoba Historical Society Transactions Series 3, Number 22, 1965–66, historiography   online edition
 Reid, Richard M.  The Upper Ottawa Valley to 1855. (1990). 354 pp.
 Rogers, Edward S. and Smith, Donald B., eds.  Aboriginal Ontario: Historical Perspectives on the First Nations. (1994). 448 pp.
 Styran, Roberta M. and Taylor, Robert R., ed.  The "Great Swivel Link": Canada's Welland Canal. Champlain Soc., 2001. 494 pp.
 Westfall, William.  Two Worlds: The Protestant Culture of Nineteenth-Century Ontario. (1989). 265 pp.
 Wilton, Carol. Popular Politics and Political Culture in Upper Canada, 1800–1850.  (2000). 311pp

Ontario since 1869
 Azoulay, Dan.  Keeping the Dream Alive: The Survival of the Ontario CCF/NDP, 1950–1963. (1997). 307 pp.
 Baskerville, Peter A.  Ontario: Image, Identity, and Power. (2002). 256pp
 Cameron, David R. and White, Graham.  Cycling into Saigon: The Conservative Transition in Ontario. (2000). 224 pp. Analysis of the 1995 transition from New Democratic Party (NDP) to Progressive Conservative (PC) rule in Ontario
 Comacchio, Cynthia R.  Nations Are Built of Babies: Saving Ontario's Mothers and Children, 1900–1940. (1993). 390 pp.
  Cook, Sharon Anne.  "Through Sunshine and Shadow": The Woman's Christian Temperance Union, Evangelicalism, and Reform in Ontario, 1874–1930. (1995). 281 pp.
 Darroch, Gordon and Soltow, Lee.  Property and Inequality in Victorian Ontario: Structural Patterns and Cultural Communities in the 1871 Census. U. of Toronto Press, 1994. 280 pp.
 Devlin, John F.  "A Catalytic State? Agricultural Policy in Ontario, 1791–2001."  PhD dissertation U. of Guelph 2004. 270 pp.   DAI 2005 65(10): 3972-A. DANQ94970  Fulltext: in ProQuest Dissertations & Theses
 Evans, A. Margaret.  Sir Oliver Mowat. U. of Toronto Press, 1992. 438 pp.  Premier 1872–1896
 Fleming, Keith R.  Power at Cost: Ontario Hydro and Rural Electrification, 1911–1958. McGill-Queen's U. Press, 1992. 326 pp.
 Gidney, R. D.  From Hope to Harris: The Reshaping of Ontario's Schools. U. of Toronto Press, 1999. 362 pp.  deals with debates and changes in education from 1950 to 2000
 Gidney, R. D. and Millar, W. P. J.  Inventing Secondary Education: The Rise of the High School in Nineteenth-Century Ontario. McGill-Queen's U. Press, 1990. 440 pp.
 Halpern, Monda.  And on that Farm He Had a Wife: Ontario Farm Women and Feminism, 1900–1970. (2001). 234 pp.  online review from H-CANADA
 Hines, Henry G.  East of Adelaide: Photographs of Commercial, Industrial and Working-Class Urban Ontario, 1905–1930. London Regional Art and History Museum, 1989.
 Hodgetts, J. E.  From Arm's Length to Hands-On: The Formative Years of Ontario's Public Service, 1867–1940. U. of Toronto Press, 1995. 296 pp.
 Houston, Susan E. and Prentice, Alison.  Schooling and Scholars in Nineteenth-Century Ontario. U. of Toronto Press, 1988. 418 pp.
  Ibbitson, John.  Promised Land: Inside the Mike Harris Revolution. Prentice-Hall, 1997. 294 pp. praise for Conservatives
 Kechnie, Margaret C.  Organizing Rural Women: the Federated Women's Institutes of Ontario, 1897–1910. McGill-Queen's U. Press, 2003. 194 pp.
 Landon, Fred, and J.E. Middleton. Province of Ontario: A History (1937) 4 vol. with 2 vol of biographies
  Marks, Lynne.  Revivals and Roller Rinks: Religion, Leisure and Identity in Late Nineteenth-Century Small-Town Ontario. U. of Toronto Press, 1996. 330 pp.
  Montigny, Edgar-Andre, and Lori Chambers, eds. Ontario since Confederation: A Reader (2000).
  Moss, Mark.  Manliness and Militarism: Educating Young Boys in Ontario for War. (2001). 216 pp.
 Neatby, H. Blair and McEown, Don.  Creating Carleton: The Shaping of a University. McGill-Queen's U. Press, 2002. 240 pp.
 Ontario Bureau of Statistics and Research. A Conspectus of the Province of Ontario (1947) online edition
 Parr, Joy, ed.  A Diversity of Women: Ontario, 1945–1980. U. of Toronto Press, 1996. 335 pp.
  Ralph, Diana; Régimbald, André; and St-Amand, Nérée, eds.  Open for Business, Closed for People: Mike Harris's Ontario. Fernwood, 1997. 207 pp.  leftwing attack on Conservative party of 1990s
 Roberts, David.  In the Shadow of Detroit: Gordon M. McGregor, Ford of Canada, and Motoropolis. Wayne State U. Press, 2006. 320 pp.
 Santink, Joy L.  Timothy Eaton and the Rise of His Department Store. U. of Toronto Press, 1990. 319 pp.
 Saywell, John T.  "Just Call Me Mitch": The Life of Mitchell F. Hepburn. U. of Toronto Press, 1991. 637 pp.  Biography of Liberal premier 1934–1942
 Schryer, Frans J.  The Netherlandic Presence in Ontario: Pillars, Class and Dutch Ethnicity. Wilfrid Laurier U. Press, 1998. 458 pp. focus is post WW2
 Schull, Joseph. Ontario since 1867 (1978), narrative history
 Stagni, Pellegrino.  The View from Rome: Archbishop Stagni's 1915 Reports on the Ontario Bilingual Schools Question. McGill-Queen's U. Press, 2002. 134 pp.
 Warecki, George M.  Protecting Ontario's Wilderness: A History of Changing Ideas and Preservation Politics, 1927–1973. Lang, 2000. 334 pp.
 White, Graham, ed.  The Government and Politics of Ontario. 5th ed. U. of Toronto Press, 1997. 458 pp.
 White, Randall.  Ontario since 1985. Eastendbooks, 1998. 320 pp.
 Wilson, Barbara M. ed. Ontario and the First World War, 1914–1918: A Collection of Documents (Champlain Society, 1977)

External links
Ontario Visual Heritage Project – Non-profit documentary project about Ontario's history
Ontario – (history of Ontario, German).

References

Citations

Sources

 
 
 

Ontario
Ontario history timelines